The men's individual competition at the Biathlon World Championships 2019 was held on 13 March 2019.

Results
The race was started at 16:10.

References

Men's individual